Jaisi or Jayasi is a toponymic surname from Jais (formerly Jayas) in northern India. Notable people with the name include:

 Kabir Ahmad Jaisi (1934–2013), Indian writer
 Malik Muhammad Jayasi (1477–1542), Indian poet who wrote in the Avadhi language

Surnames of Indian origin
Indian surnames
Toponymic surnames
Urdu-language surnames
People from Amethi district
Nisbas